Richard Wingfield, 5th Viscount Powerscourt (11 September 1790 – 9 August 1823) was an Anglo-Irish peer.

He was the son of Richard Wingfield, 4th Viscount Powerscourt and Lady Catherine Meade, daughter of John Meade, 1st Earl of Clanwilliam. On 19 July 1809 he succeeded to his father's titles in the Peerage of Ireland. In 1821, he was elected as an Irish representative peer and took his seat in the House of Lords. In August 1821 Powerscourt hosted George IV at his family home, Powerscourt House, in County Wicklow. His time in the Lords was ended by his premature death in 1823.

Powerscourt married twice; firstly to Lady Frances Theodosia Jocelyn, daughter of Robert Jocelyn, 2nd Earl of Roden and Frances Theodosia Bligh, on 6 February 1813. Following his first wife's death he married Theodosia Howard, daughter of Hon. Hugh Howard and Catherine Bligh, in August 1822. He was succeeded in his titles by his son, Richard.

References

1790 births
1823 deaths
19th-century Anglo-Irish people
Irish representative peers
Viscounts in the Peerage of Ireland